Ibrahima Sory Bah (born 1 January 1999) is a professional footballer who plays as a forward for Spanish club Rayo Cantabria. Born in Belgium, he represents the Guinea national team.

Professional career

Standard Liege
Bah made his professional debut for Standard Liège in a 3-0 Belgian First Division A loss to Kortrijk on 4 February 2017.

Oostende
On 3 June 2017, Bah transferred to Oostende, signing a contract for 3 years.

Rayo Cantabria
On 31 August 2021, he joined Rayo Cantabria in the Spanish fourth-tier Segunda División RFEF, the reserve team of Racing de Santander.

International career
Bah was born in Belgium and is of Guinean descent. He was a youth international for Belgium. On 10 October 2020, he represented the Guinea national team in a 2–1 friendly win over Cape Verde.

References

External links
 
 KVO Profile
 

1999 births
Sportspeople from Namur (city)
Belgian people of Guinean descent
Citizens of Guinea through descent
Living people
Belgian footballers
Belgium youth international footballers
Guinean footballers
Guinea international footballers
Association football forwards
Standard Liège players
K.V. Oostende players
RWDM47 players
Royale Union Saint-Gilloise players
Rayo Cantabria players
Belgian Pro League players
Challenger Pro League players
Guinean expatriate footballers
Expatriate footballers in Spain
Guinean expatriate sportspeople in Spain
Footballers from Namur (province)